Redi is an impact crater Mars, located in the Hellas quadrangle at 60.6°S latitude and 267.3°W longitude. The crater was named after 17th century Italian physician Francesco Redi. The name was approved by IAU's Working Group for Planetary System Nomenclature in 1973. Redi crater displays dust devil tracks.  Part of its floor is covered by a smooth deposit called "latitude dependent mantle."

To the northeast of Redi is Secchi crater, to the northwest is Spallanzani, and to the southeast is Huxley.

References 

Hellas quadrangle
Impact craters on Mars